935 Lies: The Future of Truth and the Decline of America's Moral Integrity is a book written by investigative journalist Charles Lewis, published by PublicAffairs in 2014, as an exploration of the many ways truth is manipulated by governments and corporations. The title is a reference to the number of times the George W. Bush and seven top officials of his administration lied to the American public about the national security threat posed by Iraq prior to the 2003 invasion.

Media attention 
The Wall Street Journal said the book was "one of the toughest critiques of television news ever written by an insider".

Lewis appeared on the June 27, 2014, episode of Moyers & Company.

References

External links 
935 Lies Official Book Website

2014 non-fiction books
Books about media bias
Books about politics of the United States
PublicAffairs books